Mändmets is an Estonian-language surname.

People named Mändmets include:
Jakob Mändmets (1871–1930), an Estonian writer and journalist
Ilmar Mändmets (born 1944), an Estonian agronomist and politician
Blythe Metz (born 1977), otherwise  Blythe Mändmets, an American actress

Estonian-language surnames